Athens Airport or Athens International Airport is the primary airport of Athens, Greece.

Athens Airport may also refer to:

 Athens Airport Station, the railway station of Athens International Airport
 Ellinikon International Airport, the old airport of Athens, Greece
 Athens Ben Epps Airport in Athens, Georgia, United States
 Athens Municipal Airport in Athens, Texas, United States